The terms "Afrocentric" may refer to:
 Afrocentrism, popular culture and ideology focused on the history and culture of black Africans
 Afrocentricity, a research method and methodological paradigm used in Black studies to center black Africans as subjects and agents within their own historical and cultural contexts